NKOTBSB is a compilation album by American supergroup NKOTBSB, which consists of New Kids on the Block and Backstreet Boys. The album was released on May 24, 2011, and features five hits from each group, two new joint recordings "All in My Head" and "Don't Turn Out the Lights", as well as a mash up. The album debuted at number seven in the US, selling 40,000 in the first week of its release. The album coincides with the joint tour featuring the groups, starting at the Allstate Arena in Rosemont, Illinois on May 25, 2011. The album was granted a Silver certification in UK.

Background
Both bands first performed together at the Radio City Music Hall in the summer of 2010, and a joint tour was announced later that year. In March 2011, fans were encouraged to vote online for their favourite tracks from the separate groups; choices that would influence the track list for their joint compilation album. After nearly 250,000 votes, the track listing of "NKOTBSB" was announced on April 11, 2011. It also features two new tracks, "Don't Turn Out the Lights" and "All in My Head", as well as an "NKOTBSB Mashup". "All in My Head" was originally an unreleased track by the Backstreet Boys for their album This Is Us, while the mashup features a collection hits by the supergroup, similar to their AMA performance.

The album is available in several editions. The regular edition features a 16-page booklet with personal messages from each member of the supergroup, and a tour poster. Each edition comes with an instant download of "Don't Turn Out the Lights". Additionally, all those who pre-ordered the album have their names featured in a poster that comes with the album. A deluxe edition was exclusively released at Wal-Mart. This edition features a DVD showing rehearsals for the NKOTBSB Tour along with the recording session for the new songs.

Singles
"Don't Turn Out the Lights" was released as the lead single from the album on April 5, 2011 by Legacy Recordings. The track made its first appearance in December on the BSB Cruise. The song premiered on On Air with Ryan Seacrest and released to iTunes the same day. The single debuted at number #14 on the US Billboard Bubbling Under Hot 100 Singles chart on April 14, 2011.

Track listing

Chart positions

References

2011 greatest hits albums
Backstreet Boys albums
New Kids on the Block albums
Legacy Recordings compilation albums
Collaborative albums
Jive Records compilation albums
Columbia Records compilation albums